St. Godehard's Rotunda in Strzelin  is a Romanesque church founded in the 11th century and rebuilt in the 13th century.

References

Strzelin County
Strzelin